Bitter Tears: Ballads of the American Indian is a 1964 concept album, the twentieth album released by singer Johnny Cash on Columbia Records. It is one of several Americana records by Cash. This one focuses on the history of Native Americans in the United States and their problems. Cash believed that his ancestry included Cherokee, which partly inspired his work on this recording. The songs in this album address the harsh and unfair treatment of the indigenous peoples of North America by Europeans in the United States. Two deal with 20th-century issues affecting the Seneca and Pima peoples. It was considered controversial and rejected by some radio stations and fans.

In 2014 a tribute album, Look Again to the Wind: Johnny Cash's Bitter Tears Revisited, was released with contributions by Gillian Welch, Dave Rawlings, Emmylou Harris, Bill Miller, and others. This was also the name of a documentary film about the suppression of Cash's Native American-themed album in the 1960s. This aired on PBS in February and November 2016.

Songwriting
Believing that he had some Cherokee ancestry, Cash was inspired by Native American activism and issues in the 1960s, a time of social upheaval in the United States. He was concerned about injustices against these peoples. He later learned that his ancestry was limited to the British Isles: English, Scots, Scots-Irish and Irish, but continued activism.

Peter La Farge wrote five of the songs, two were by Cash, and the final track was by Cash and Johnny Horton. The first song, "As Long as the Grass Shall Grow", by La Farge, concerns the contemporary loss of Seneca nation land in Pennsylvania and New York (the Cornplanter Tract) due to condemnation for federal construction of the Kinzua Dam in the early 1960s. "The Ballad of Ira Hayes", tells about Ira Hayes, a young Marine of Pima descent, who participated in the flag raising on Iwo Jima during World War II. After becoming an instant celebrity because of the iconic photo of this event, Hayes struggled with life in the postwar years. He returned to his native Gila River Reservation, where the government had built a dam that diverted critical water supply. Hayes died of alcoholism and in poverty.

In addition to those songs, La Farge's song "Custer" mocks the popular veneration of General George Custer. He was overwhelmingly defeated, in part due to his own errors, by Lakota warriors at Little Big Horn. (Buffy Sainte-Marie has sung a version of this song in concert as "Custer Song".)

Cash rerecorded "As Long as the Grass Shall Grow" decades after the release of the Bitter Tears album.  He released it on Unearthed, with the lyrics altered to express his devotion to his wife June Carter Cash; the track was recorded as a duet between them, one of their final recorded duets. Cash also performed "As Long as the Grass Shall Grow" on the short-lived Pete Seeger television program Rainbow Quest, backed by Pete Seeger and June Carter. Cash and Seeger also discussed Peter La Farge and their mutual admiration for him as a songwriter, and his ability to grapple with social issues in his music.

Reception
Bitter Tears and one single were successful, the album rising to No. 2 and "The Ballad of Ira Hayes", reaching No. 3 on the Billboard Hot Country Singles chart. But this required effort. Though the song started out quickly on the Billboard chart, seven weeks later the song was floundering in the mid-teens. According to later accounts, by stressing the Native American theme, Cash had entered contemporary controversial social issues and upheaval of the period. He encountered resistance to this work.

"Facing censorship and an angry backlash from radio stations, DJs and fans for speaking out on behalf of Native people, Cash decided to fight back." He paid for a full-page ad that appeared in the August 22, 1964 issue of Billboard magazine, calling some DJs and programmers "gutless" for not playing the Ira Hayes song, and asking why they were afraid to do so. He left the question unanswered.

Cash began a campaign to support the Ira Hayes song, buying and sending out more than 1,000 copies to radio stations across America. By September 19, the song had reached number 3 in Billboard.

In 2010, the Western Writers of America chose "The Ballad of Ira Hayes" as one of the Top 100 Western songs of all time.

Track listing

Personnel

Main
 Johnny Cash - vocals, guitar
 Luther Perkins, Norman Blake, Bob Johnson - guitar
 Marshall Grant - bass
 W.S. Holland - drums
 The Carter Family - vocal accompaniment

Additional personnel
Produced by: Don Law and Frank Jones
Cover Photo: Bob Cato
Reissue Producer: Bob Irwin
Digitally Mastered by: Vic Anesini, Sony Music Studios, NY (CD Reissue)
Liner Notes: Hugh Cherry

Charts 
Album – Billboard (United States)

Singles - Billboard (United States)

Reissue and revival
The album was included on the Bear Family Records box set Come Along and Ride This Train in 1984.

In 2011, after Antonino D'Ambrosio published A Heartbeat and a Guitar: Johnny Cash and the Making of Bitter Tears, there was renewed interest in the album. D'Ambrosio acted as executive producer, and also made a documentary film about, the re-recording of the songs by various artists, who were chosen for their personal interest in the album. Called Look Again To The Wind: Johnny Cash’s Bitter Tears Revisited, the album was released by Sony Masterworks in 2014.

The documentary is We're Still Here: Johnny Cash's Bitter Tears Revisited. It first aired on PBS on February 1, 2016, and was scheduled to re-air in November 2016.

Song listing
Performers shown in brackets:
 "As Long as the Grass Shall Grow" (Gillian Welch & David Rawlings)
 "Apache Tears" (Emmylou Harris w/the Milk Carton Kids)
 "Custer" (Steve Earle w/the Milk Carton Kids)
 "The Talking Leaves" (Nancy Blake w/Emmylou Harris, Gillian Welch and David Rawlings)
 "The Ballad of Ira Hayes" (Kris Kristofferson w/Gillian Welch and David Rawlings)
 "Drums" (Norman Blake w/Nancy Blake, Emmylou Harris, Gillian Welch and David Rawlings)
 "Apache Tears (Reprise)" (Gillian Welch and David Rawlings)
 "White Girl" (Milk Carton Kids)
 "The Vanishing Race" (Rhiannon Giddens) Additional words by Rhiannon Giddens
 "As Long as the Grass Shall Grow (Reprise)" (Nancy Blake, Gillian Welch and David Rawlings)
 "Look Again to the Wind" (Bill Miller) Peter La Farge song not included on the original album.

References

External links 
 Luma Electronic entry on Bitter Tears: Ballads of the American Indian

Johnny Cash albums
1964 albums
Columbia Records albums
Concept albums
Native Americans in popular culture
Works about Native Americans